The 1952 GP Ouest-France was the 16th edition of the GP Ouest-France cycle race and was held on 26 August 1952. The race started and finished in Plouay. The race was won by Émile Guérinel.

General classification

References

1952
1952 in road cycling
1952 in French sport